Jiří Zedníček (born February 14, 1945) is a former Czech professional basketball player. He was voted to the Czechoslovakian 20th Century Team.

Club career
In his club career, Zedníček won the European-wide secondary level FIBA Cup Winner's Cup (later called FIBA Saporta Cup) championship, in the 1968–69 season. He was a member of the FIBA European Selection Team in 1966, 1967, 1969, 1971, and 1972.

National team career
Zedníček represented the senior Czechoslovakian national team at several EuroBaskets, and at the 1972 Summer Olympic Games. At the EuroBasket 1967, he was named the MVP of the tournament. 

With the national team, he also won a silver medal at the EuroBasket in Finland, in 1967, and a bronze medal at the EuroBasket in Italy, in 1969. At the 1970 FIBA World Championship, he was a member of the Czech national team that finished the tournament in sixth place. He was also on the Czech team that finished in 10th place at the 1974 FIBA World Championship.

See also
Czechoslovak Basketball League career stats leaders

References

External links
FIBA Profile
FIBA Europe Profile

1945 births
Living people
Basketball players at the 1972 Summer Olympics
Czech men's basketball players
Czechoslovak men's basketball players
1970 FIBA World Championship players
1974 FIBA World Championship players
Olympic basketball players of Czechoslovakia
Point guards
Sportspeople from Prague
USK Praha players